Steaua București is a Romanian professional football club based in Bucharest, whose team has regularly taken part in Union of European Football Associations (UEFA) competitions. Qualification for Romanian clubs is determined by a team's performance in its domestic league and cup competitions. Steaua have regularly qualified for the primary European competition, the European Cup, by winning the Liga I. Steaua have also achieved European qualification via the Cupa României and have played in both the former UEFA Cup Winners' Cup and the UEFA Cup (now called the UEFA Europa League).

Steaua's first match in European competition was in the 1957–58 European Cup against Borussia Dortmund of West Germany. So far, they have competed 28 times in the European Champions' Cup / Champions League, 21 times in the UEFA Cup / Europa League, 11 times in the Cup Winners' Cup, 2 times in the UEFA Europa Conference League, 1 time in the UEFA Super Cup, and 1 in the Intercontinental Cup. There were five consecutive participations in the European Cup during the 1980s and six in the 1990s. Since 2003, Steaua is a regular appearance in the UEFA competitions. As of September 2018, it has 14 consecutive seasons of European Cup participations.

Steaua won the European Cup in 1986, becoming the only Romanian and the first Eastern European club to do so, by defeating Barcelona on a penalty shootout. They again reached the European Cup Final in 1989, but lost 4–0 to Milan. Steaua's record wins in Europe are a 6–0 victory over Young Boys in the 1979–80 European Cup Winners' Cup and a 6–0 victory over Aalborg BK (AaB for short) in a home match in the group stage of the 2014–15 UEFA Europa League.

European competitions 

The first continental competition organised by UEFA was the European Cup in 1955. It is the most prestigious European competition and was conceived by the editor of L'Équipe Gabriel Hanot, as a competition for winners of the European national football leagues. The format of the competition was changed for the 1992–93 season to include a group stage instead of the straight knockout format previously in use. The competition was also renamed as the UEFA Champions League. Further changes were made for the 1997–98 season, with the runners-up from countries placed highly in the UEFA coefficients allowed to enter. This was later expanded to four team for the top countries in the coefficients.

A number of other European competitions have also taken place. The secondary cup competition is the UEFA Cup, which was established in 1972. The competition was initially open to teams who finished as runners-up in their respective national leagues. This was later expanded based on the countries rank in the coefficients and performance in domestic cup competitions. The competition was renamed as the UEFA Europa League for the 2009–10 season. The UEFA Cup Winners' Cup was a competition for the winners of all European domestic cup competitions. Established in 1960 it was considered the secondary cup competitions until the re-branding of the European Cup, which weakened the competition and it was considered the weakest of the three competitions. The competition was discontinued in 1999 and amalgamated into the UEFA Cup.

The UEFA Super Cup is a competition between the winners of the Champions League and Europa League. It was contested between the winners of the Champions League and Cup Winners' Cup up until the discontinuation of the latter in 1999. The competition was originally held over two-legs but was changed to a single match in 1998. The Inter-Cities Fairs Cup was established in 1955 and run independently of UEFA. It was initially for team from cities that hosted trade fairs, it was later expanded to include runners-up from the domestic leagues. In 1971, it came under the control of UEFA and was re-branded as the UEFA Cup. Established in 1960 the Intercontinental Cup was a competition for the winners of the European Cup and the South American equivalent the Copa Libertadores. Jointly organised by UEFA and the Confederación Sudamericana de Fútbol (CONMEBOL) it was contested until 2004, when it was replaced by the FIFA Club World Cup which included the winners of all six confederations regional championships.

History

Under communism (1947–1989) 

On 7 June 1947, at the initiative of several officers of the Romanian Royal House, the first Romanian sports club of the Army was born through a decree signed by General Mihail Lascăr, High Commander of the Romanian Royal Army. The club was to be called ASA București (Asociația Sportivă a Armatei București – English: Army Sports Association), with seven different sections (football, fencing, volleyball, boxing, shooting, athletics, tennis), and its leadership was entrusted to General-Major Oreste Alexandrescu. With a squad gathered in record time, ASA was preparing itself for the Romanian second league promotion play-offs. However, the new Communist government that had come to power in 1945 and assumed total control of the country at the end of 1947 stated that every sports association in the country was now to be linked to a certain trade union, be it a State Department, a Ministry or a company. However, this was not the case for first league club, Carmen București, owned by wealthy industrialist Dumitru Mociorniță, who saw his team excluded from the championship and later on dissolved, its place in the 1st league being now taken by newly formed ASA.

The team's first official competition was the 1947–48 Romanian Football Championship season, in which they finished 14th. Their first official match was played in Bucharest against Dermata Cluj and ended 0-0. The team managed to avoid relegation after a play-out with seven other teams. On 5 June 1948, by Order 289 of the Ministry of National Defence, ASA became CSCA (Clubul Sportiv Central al Armatei – English: Central Sports Club of the Army), after which performances began to roll. In March 1950, CSCA changed its name to CCA (Casa Centrală a Armatei, English: "Central House of the Army").

The 1950s were years of great domestic performances, ones in which the famous "CCA Golden Team" was formed. 1956 was one of CCA's most prestigious years, when, apart from winning the title, the team entered a tournament in England where they defeated Luton Town 4–3, drew against Arsenal 1–1 and Sheffield Wednesday 3–3, then lost 5–0 to Wolverhampton Wanderers. Further, on 22 April 1956, the Romania national team defeated Yugoslavia 1–0 in Belgrade with a team comprised only by CCA players. In 1957, the team also made their first European Cup appearance, falling to Borussia Dortmund after a play-off in Bologna.

In 1961, CCA changed its name once again (for the final time) to CSA Steaua București (Clubul Sportiv al Armatei Steaua – English: Army Sports Club Steaua). The word "steaua" is Romanian for "the star and was adopted because of the presence, just like in any other Eastern-European Army team, of a red star on their badge.

Under the leadership of coaches Emerich Jenei and Anghel Iordănescu, Steaua had an impressive Championship run in the 1984–85 season, which they eventually won after a six-year drought. What followed was an astonishing European Cup season. After knocking-out Vejle Boldklub, Budapest Honvéd, Lahti and Anderlecht, they were the first ever Romanian team to make it into a Champions League final. On 7 May 1986, at the Ramón Sánchez Pizjuán Stadium in Seville, Spanish champions Barcelona were clear favourites, but after a goalless draw, goalkeeper Helmuth Duckadam saved all four penalties taken by Barça, being the first ever Romanian to reach the Guinness Book for that achievement, while Gavril Balint and Marius Lăcătuș converted their penalties to make Steaua the first Eastern European team to win the supreme continental trophy.

Gheorghe Hagi, arguably the all-time best Romanian footballer, joined the club a few months later, scoring the only goal of the match against Dynamo Kyiv which brought Steaua an additional European Super Cup on 24 February 1987 in Monaco, just two months after having lost the Intercontinental Cup 1–0 to Argentinians River Plate in Tokyo.

Steaua remained at the top of European football for the rest of the decade, managing one more Champions League semi-final against Benfica (1987–88) and one more Champions League final in 1989, which was lost 4–0 in to the Milan side of Marco van Basten, Ruud Gullit and Frank Rijkaard.

During these last years of the Communist regime in Romania, dictator Nicolae Ceaușescu's son Valentin was involved in the life of the team. Even though a controversial character, Valentin Ceaușescu admitted in a recent interview he had done nothing else than to protect his favourite team from Dinamo București's sphere of influence, ensured by the Ministry of Internal Affairs. Though contested by some, their five-year winning streak in the championship between 1984–85 and 1988–89 corroborates the notion that the team was really the best during this period.

 Post-Revolution (1990–present) 

The Romanian Revolution led the country towards a free open market and, subsequently, several players of the great 1980s team left for other clubs in the West. Gheorghe Hagi joined Real Madrid for a then club record $4.3 million fee, Marius Lăcătuș to Fiorentina, Dan Petrescu to Foggia, Silviu Lung to Logroñés, Ștefan Iovan to Brighton & Hove Albion, Tudorel Stoica to Lens and so on.

Therefore, three years followed in which the club won only a national cup in the 1991–92 season. However, a swift recovery followed and Steaua managed a six consecutive championship streak between 1992–93 and 1997–98. The club managed to reach the UEFA Cup Winners' Cup quarter-finals in 1993, when they lost on away goals to Royal Antwerp, and also qualified for the Champions League group stage for three-straight years between 1994–95 and 1996–97.

In 1998, following lobbying from football department president Marcel Pușcaș and new LPF regulations, the football club separated from CSA Steaua București and changed their name for the final time to FC Steaua București (Fotbal Club Steaua București'').

In the summer of 2004, following a third consecutive year with no trophy won, former Italy goalkeeper Walter Zenga was appointed as head coach, becoming the first ever foreign Steaua manager. Following the appointment, results came immediately, as the team qualified for the UEFA Cup group stage and further on became the first Romanian team to make it to the European football spring since 1993, where they defeated holders Valencia after a penalty shoot-out at Ghencea. Zenga was sacked with three matchdays to go in the Divizia A, but Steaua eventually won the title, performance repeated the following year with manager Cosmin Olăroiu. Under Olăroiu they reached the UEFA Cup semi-finals in 2005–06, where they were eliminated by Middlesbrough by a last minute goal. This was their best performance at a European competition since reaching the final of the 1988–89 European Cup.

The next season, after having successfully passed two qualifying rounds against Gorica and Standard Liège, Steaua reached the group stage of the 2006–07 UEFA Champions League, where they finished in third position in Group E, behind Lyon (0–3 home, 1–1 away) and Real Madrid (1–4 home, 0–1 away) and in front of Dynamo Kyiv (1–1 home, 4–1 away). However, their continuation in the UEFA Cup was short, having been eliminated by title holders Sevilla in the round of 32.

In the 2007–08 UEFA Champions League, they eliminated Zagłębie Lubin (1–0 away and 2–1 home) and BATE Borisov (2–2 away and 2–0 home) to reach the group stage, where they were drawn alongside Arsenal, Sevilla and Sparta Prague. However, their performance was sub-par, finishing last with one point.

The 2008–09 UEFA Champions League season saw Steaua advance to the group stage after defeating Galatasaray (2–2 away and 1–0 home), only to again finish in last place with one point, after Bayern Munich, Lyon and Fiorentina.

The 2012–13 season saw Steaua achieve their best European performance in six seasons, reaching the 2012–13 UEFA Europa League Round of 16 where they lost to eventual winners Chelsea. Steaua most recently qualified for the Champions League group stages in 2013–14, finishing last in their group with Chelsea, Schalke and Basel.

Total statistics

Statistics by country

Statistics by competition 

Notes for the abbreviations in the tables below:

 QR: Qualifying round
 PR: Preliminary round
 1R: First round
 2R: Second round
 3R: Third round
 QF: Quarter-finals
 SF: Semi-finals
 F: Final
 1QR: First qualifying round
 2QR: Second qualifying round
 3QR: Third qualifying round
 PO: Play-off round
 R32: Round of 32
 R16: Round of 16

UEFA Champions League / European Cup 

1 At the time, the away goal rule was not applied, so a play–off match was played on a neutral ground (Bologna), won 3–1, by Borussia.

2 After the defeat of the Romania team against Czechoslovakia in the quarter–finals of the 1960 UEFA European Championship (0:2 in Bucharest and 0:3 in Bratislava), the Communist Authorities decided the withdrawal of all Romanian teams from international competitions to avoid the risk of further "humiliation". Consequently, Romania did not compete also for the qualifiers for 1962 FIFA World Cup where Romania had to play Italy.

3 This match ended 3–2, but PSG had fielded a suspended player (Laurent Fournier), so UEFA awarded 3–0 for Steaua.

UEFA Super Cup / European Super Cup

UEFA Europa League / UEFA Cup

UEFA Europa Conference League

UEFA Cup Winners' Cup / European Cup Winners' Cup

Intercontinental Cup

European competitions goals

Goals by player

Hat-tricks

Two goals in one match

References

External links 

 Official website 
 UEFA website
 RSSSF European Cups Archive

FC Steaua București
Romanian football clubs in international competitions